Events from the year 1439 in France

Incumbents
 Monarch – Charles VII

Events
 11 June - Catherine of France, Countess of Charolais is betrothed to Charles the Bold of Burgundy. They marry the following year.
 Unknown - Strasbourg Cathedral is completed.

References

1430s in France